The 2008–09 Super League Greece was the 73rd season of the highest football league of Greece and the third under the name Super League. The season began on 31 August 2008 and ended on 26 April 2009. The league consisted of 16 teams. Participants were the 13 best teams from the 2007–08 season and three teams who have been promoted from Beta Ethniki. Olympiacos successfully defended their title after claiming their 37th title overall with three rounds remaining.

Team changes from 2007–08
Teams promoted from 2007–08 Beta Ethniki:
 Champions: Panserraikos
 Runners-up: Thrasyvoulos
 3rd placed team: Panthrakikos

Teams relegated to 2008–09 Beta Ethniki:
 14th placed team: Atromitos
 15th placed team: Veria
 16th placed team: Apollon Kalamarias

Teams

Stadia and personnel

 1 On final match day of the season, played on 26 April 2009.

Regular season

League table

Results

Play-offs
The play-offs for an additional Champions League spot were conducted in a home and away round robin format. Its participants have entered the mini-league with a number of bonus points based on their regular season record. Every team had the number of points earned by the fifth-placed team subtracted from its own number of points. The result was then divided through five and rounded to the nearest whole number to determine the number of bonus points.

The teams started the play-offs with the following number of points:
 PAOK – 3 points ((63–49) / 5 = 2.8, rounded up to 3)
 Panathinaikos – 2 points ((61–49) / 5 = 2.4, rounded down to 2)
 AEK Athens – 1 point ((55–49) / 5 = 1.2, rounded down to 1)
 AEL – 0 points ((49 –49) / 5 = 0)

The play-off winners entered the third qualifying round of the UEFA Champions League. Since AEK Athens have lost the final of the 2008–09 Greek Cup to Champions League-bound Olympiacos, all three Greek Europa League spots (two via league, one via domestic cup) were allotted according to the position of the respective teams in the play-off.

Statistics

Top scorers

Source: galanissportsdata.com

Top assists

Source: galanissportsdata.com

Most valuable players (excluding goalkeepers)

Source: galanissportsdata.com

Awards

Annual awards

Annual awards were announced on 9 November 2010

Player of the Year  
Player of the Year awarded to  Luciano Galletti (Olympiacos)

Foreign Player of the Year  
Foreign Player of the Year awarded to  Luciano Galletti (Olympiacos)

Top goalscorer of the Year 
Top goalscorer of the Year awarded to  Luciano Galletti (Olympiacos) and  Ismael Blanco (AEK Athens)

Greek Player of the Year  
The Greek Player of the Year awarded to  Dimitris Salpingidis (Panathinaikos)

Manager of the Year  
The Manager of the Year awarded to  Fernando Santos (PAOK)

Young Player of the Year  
The Young Player of the Year awarded to  Vasilios Koutsianikoulis (Ergotelis)

Goalkeeper of the Year  
The Goalkeeper of the Year awarded to  Antonis Nikopolidis (Olympiacos)

Transfers

See also
2008–09 Greek Cup
2008–09 Beta Ethniki

References

External links

Official website 
Superleague Statistics

Super League Greece seasons
1
Greece